Andrii Akimenko (born 12 June 1994) is a Ukrainian handball player for  CS Dinamo București and the Ukrainian national team.

He represented Ukraine at the 2020 European Men's Handball Championship.

References

1994 births
Living people
Ukrainian male handball players
Sportspeople from Zaporizhzhia
ZTR players
CS Dinamo București (men's handball) players
Ukrainian expatriate sportspeople in Poland
Ukrainian expatriate sportspeople in Romania
21st-century Ukrainian people